At least two ships of the French Navy have been named Touareg:

 , an  launched in 1917 and struck in 1935.
 , a  launched as USS Bright in 1943 and transferred to France in 1950. She was broken up in 1965.

French Navy ship names